Sajida Yousaf is a Pakistani politician who has been a member of the Provincial Assembly of the Punjab since August 2018.

Political career

She was elected to the Provincial Assembly of the Punjab as a candidate of Pakistan Tehreek-e-Insaf (PTI) on a reserved seat for women in the 2018 Pakistani general election. She de-seated due to a vote against the party policy for the Chief Minister of Punjab election on 16 April 2022.

References

Living people
Punjabi people
Punjab MPAs 2018–2023
Pakistan Tehreek-e-Insaf MPAs (Punjab)
Year of birth missing (living people)
Women members of the Provincial Assembly of the Punjab
21st-century Pakistani women politicians